Betta mandor is a species of gourami endemic to the island of Borneo where it is only known from the Indonesian province of Kalimantan Barat where it is found in the Kapuas basin.  It is an inhabitant of streams and pools in forested swamps, usually found in quite shallow waters.  It feeds on insects and other small invertebrate prey.  This species can reach a length of  TL.  This species can also be found in the aquarium trade.

References

mandor
Taxa named by Heok Hui Tan
Taxa named by Ng Peter Kee Lin
Freshwater fish of Indonesia
Fish described in 2006